Stefan Frey (born 16 May 1959) is a German badminton player. Frey competed in the men's doubles tournament at the 1992 Summer Olympics.

References

External links
 

1959 births
Living people
German male badminton players
Olympic badminton players of Germany
Badminton players at the 1992 Summer Olympics
Place of birth missing (living people)
People from Worms, Germany
Sportspeople from Rhineland-Palatinate